Oodla Wirra (formerly Penn) is a small town in the upper Mid North of South Australia. It is on the Barrier Highway approximately halfway from Adelaide to Broken Hill.

When the railway was built in 1880, a siding was provided, named Oodla Wirra. Soon after, a town was surveyed near the siding, but it was named Penn. This naming conflict continued until 1940, when the town was renamed Oodla Wirra, to match the railway station.

Railway
Oodla Wirra is a former railway town, as it was on the narrow-gauge railway between Port Pirie and Cockburn (where it connected to the Silverton Tramway to Broken Hill). When the Commonwealth Government replaced the narrow gauge line with a standard gauge line, the revised route passed south and east of the town.

A railway employee was killed in a shunting accident in the Oodla Wirra railyards in 1909.

In 1889, ironstone flux was mined from a failed silver mine a few miles away, and carted to Oodla Wirra to be transported by rail to the smelters at Port Pirie.

References

Towns in South Australia
Mid North (South Australia)